John Arnold Griffin III (April 24, 1928 – July 25, 2008) was an American jazz tenor saxophonist. Nicknamed "the Little Giant" for his short stature and forceful playing, Griffin's career began in the mid-1940s and continued until the month of his death. A pioneering figure in hard bop, Griffin recorded prolifically as a bandleader in addition to stints with pianist Thelonious Monk, drummer Art Blakey, in partnership with fellow tenor Eddie "Lockjaw" Davis and as a member of the Kenny Clarke/Francy Boland Big Band after he moved to Europe in the 1960s. In 1995, Griffin was awarded an Honorary Doctorate of Music from Berklee College of Music.

Early life and career 
Griffin studied music at DuSable High School in Chicago under Walter Dyett, starting out on clarinet before moving on to oboe and then alto saxophone. While still at high school at the age of 15, Griffin was playing with T-Bone Walker in a band led by Walker's brother.

Alto saxophone was still his instrument of choice when he joined Lionel Hampton's big band, three days after his high school graduation, but Hampton encouraged him to take up the tenor, playing alongside Arnett Cobb. He first appeared on a Los Angeles recording with Hampton's band in 1945 at the age of 17.

By mid-1947, Griffin and fellow Hampton band member Joe Morris, had formed a sextet made up of local musicians, including George Freeman, where he remained for the next two years. His playing can be heard on early rhythm and blues recordings for Atlantic Records. By 1951, Griffin was playing baritone saxophone in an R&B septet led by former bandmate Arnett Cobb.

After returning to Chicago from two years in the Army, Griffin began to establish a reputation as one of the premiere saxophonists in that city. Thelonious Monk enthusiastically encouraged Orrin Keepnews of the Riverside label to sign the young tenor, but before he could act Blue Note had signed Griffin.

He joined Art Blakey's Jazz Messengers in 1957, and his recordings from that time include an album joining together the Messengers and Thelonious Monk. Griffin then succeeded John Coltrane as a member of Monk's Five Spot quartet; he can be heard on the albums Thelonious in Action and Misterioso.

Griffin's unique style, based on an astounding technique, included a vast canon of bebop language. He was known to quote generously from classical, opera and other musical forms. A prodigious player, he was often subjected to "cutting sessions" (a musical battle between two musicians) involving a legion of tenor players, both in his hometown Chicago with Hank Mobley and Gene Ammons, and on the road. Diminutive, he was distinctive as a fashionable dresser, a good businessman, and a well-liked bandleader to other musicians.
Griffin was leader on his first Blue Note album Introducing Johnny Griffin in 1956. Also featuring Wynton Kelly on piano, Curly Russell on bass and Max Roach on drums, the recording brought Griffin critical acclaim.

The album A Blowin' Session (1957) featured John Coltrane and Hank Mobley. He played with Art Blakey's Jazz Messengers for a few months in 1957 and in the Thelonious Monk Sextet and Quartet (1958). During this period, he recorded a set with Clark Terry on Serenade to a Bus Seat, featuring the rhythm trio of Wynton Kelly, Paul Chambers, and Philly Joe Jones.

Move to Europe 
Griffin moved to France in 1963 and to the Netherlands in 1978. His relocation was the result of several factors, including income tax problems, a failing marriage and feeling "embittered by the critical acceptance of free jazz" in the United States, as journalist Ben Ratliff wrote. Apart from appearing regularly under his own name at jazz clubs such as London's Ronnie Scott's, Griffin became a "first choice" sax player for visiting US musicians touring the continent during the 1960s and 1970s.

In 1965, he recorded albums with Wes Montgomery. He briefly rejoined Monk's groups (an Octet and Nonet) in 1967. From 1967 to 1969, he was part of the Kenny Clarke/Francy Boland Big Band.

Griffin and Davis met up again in 1970 and recorded Tough Tenors Again 'n' Again, and again with the Dizzy Gillespie Big 7 at the Montreux Jazz Festival. In the late 1970s, Griffin recorded with Peter Herbolzheimer and His Big Band, which also included, among others, Nat Adderley, Derek Watkins, Art Farmer, Slide Hampton, Jiggs Whigham, Herb Geller, Wilton Gaynair, Stan Getz, Gerry Mulligan, Rita Reys, Jean "Toots" Thielemans, Niels-Henning Ørsted Pedersen, Grady Tate, and Quincy Jones as arranger. He also recorded with the Nat Adderley Quintet in 1978, having previously recorded with Adderley in 1958.

In 1978, Griffin and Dexter Gordon returned to the U.S., and the two performed at the Ann Arbor Blues and Jazz Festival, before recording Live at Carnegie Hall.

Griffin's last concert was in Hyères, France on July 21, 2008. On July 25, 2008, he died of a heart attack at the age of 80 in Mauprévoir, near Availles-Limouzine, France.

Discography

As leader/co-leader 
 1956: Johnny Griffin (Argo, 1958)
 1956: Introducing Johnny Griffin (Blue Note, 1957)
 1957: A Blowin Session (Blue Note, 1957)
 1957: The Congregation (Blue Note, 1958)
 1958: Johnny Griffin Sextet (Riverside, 1958)
 1958: Way Out! (Riverside, 1958)
 1959: The Little Giant (Riverside, 1959)
 1960: The Big Soul-Band (Riverside, 1960)
 1960: Battle Stations with Eddie "Lockjaw" Davis (Prestige, 1960)
 1960: Johnny Griffin's Studio Jazz Party (Riverside, 1960)
 1960: Tough Tenors with Eddie "Lockjaw" Davis (Jazzland, 1960)
 1960: Griff & Lock with Eddie "Lockjaw" Davis (Jazzland, 1961)
 1961: The First Set with Eddie "Lockjaw" Davis (Prestige, 1964) – live
 1961: The Tenor Scene with Eddie "Lockjaw" Davis (Prestige, 1961) – live
 1961: The Late Show with Eddie "Lockjaw" Davis (Prestige, 1965) – live
 1961: The Midnight Show with Eddie "Lockjaw" Davis (Prestige, 1964) – live
 1961: Lookin' at Monk! with Eddie "Lockjaw" Davis (Jazzland, 1961)
 1961: Change of Pace (Riverside, 1961)
 1961: Blues Up & Down with Eddie "Lockjaw" Davis (Jazzland, 1961)
 1961: White Gardenia (Riverside, 1961)
 1961–62: The Kerry Dancers (Riverside, 1962)
 1962: Tough Tenor Favorites with Eddie "Lockjaw" Davis (Jazzland, 1962)
 1962: Grab This! (Riverside, 1962)
 1963: Soul Groove with Matthew Gee (Atlantic, 1964)
 1963: Do Nothing 'til You Hear from Me (Riverside, 1963)
 1964: Night Lady (Philips, 1964)
 1967: The Man I Love (Polydor, 1969)
 1967: You Leave Me Breathless (Black Lion, 1972)
 1967: A Night in Tunisia (Trio, 1979)

 1968: Jazz Undulation (Joker, 1977)
 1968: Lady Heavy Bottom's Waltz (Vogue, 1969)
 1970: Tough Tenors Again 'n' Again (MPS, 1970)
 1973: Blues for Harvey (SteepleChase, 1973) – live
 1974: Johnny Griffin Live at Music Inn (Horo, 1974) – live
 1975: The Jamfs Are Coming! (Timeless, 1978) – live
 1976: Johnny Griffin Live in Tokyo (Philips, 1976) – live
 1976: The Little Giant Revisited (Philips, 1977) – live
 1978: Sincerely Ours with Rolf Ericson (Four Leaf Clover, 1978)
 1978: Return of the Griffin (Galaxy, 1979)
 1978: Bush Dance (Galaxy, 1979)
 1978?: Birds and Ballads (Galaxy, 1978)
 1979: NYC Underground (Galaxy, 1981) – live
 1979: To the Ladies (Galaxy, 1982)
 1980: Meeting (Jeton, 1982)
 1981: Live / Autumn Leaves (Verve, 1997) – live
 1983: Call It Whachawana (Galaxy, 1983)
 1984: Tough Tenors Back Again! with Eddie "Lockjaw" Davis (Storyville, 1997)
 1985: Three Generations of Tenor Saxophone (JHM, 1997)[2CD]
 1987: Have You Met Barcelona with Ben Sidran et al. (Orange Blue, 1989)
 1988: Take My Hand (Who's Who in Jazz, 1988)
 1990: The Cat (Antilles, 1991)
 1992: Dance of Passion (Antilles, 1993)
 1994?: Chicago-New york-Paris (Verve, 1994)
 1999: In and Out with Martial Solal (Dreyfus, 2000)
 2000: Johnny Griffin and Steve Grossman Quintet with Steve Grossman (Dreyfus, 2001)
 2000: Close Your Eyes with Horace Parlan (Minor Music, 2000)
 2002: Johnny Griffin and the Great Danes with the Great Danes (Stunt, 2003)

As sideman 

With Ahmed Abdul-Malik
 Jazz Sahara (Riverside, 1958)
 East Meets West (RCA Victor, 1960)

With Nat Adderley
 Branching Out (Riverside, 1958)
 A Little New York Midtown Music (Galaxy, 1978)

With Art Blakey
 Selections from Lerner and Loewe's... (Vik, 1957)
 A Night in Tunisia (Vik, 1957)
 Cu-Bop (Jubilee, 1957)
 Art Blakey's Jazz Messengers with Thelonious Monk (Atlantic, 1957)
 Hard Drive (Bethlehem, 1957)

With the Kenny Clarke/Francy Boland Big Band
 Sax No End (SABA, 1967)
 Out of the Folk Bag (Columbia, 1967)
 17 Men and Their Music (Campi, 1967)
 All Smiles (MPS, 1968)
 Faces (MPS, 1969)
 Latin Kaleidoscope (MPS, 1968)
 Fellini 712 (MPS, 1969)
 All Blues (MPS, 1969)
 More Smiles (MPS, 1969)
 Volcano (Polydor, 1969)
 Clarke Boland Big Band en Concert avec Europe 1 (Tréma, 1992) – recorded in 1969

With Dizzy Gillespie
 The Giant (America, 1973)
 The Source (America, 1973)
 The Dizzy Gillespie Big 7 (Pablo, 1975)

With Philly Joe Jones
 Blues for Dracula (Riverside, 1958)
 Look Stop Listen (Uptown, 1983) with Dameronia

With Thelonious Monk
 Thelonious in Action (Riverside, 1958) – live
 Misterioso (Riverside, 1958) – live

With Bud Powell
 Bud in Paris (1975, Xanadu) – live recorded in 1960
 Earl Bud Powell, Vol. 8: Holidays in Edenville, 64 (Mythic Sound, 1964)

With A. K. Salim
 Stable Mates (Savoy, 1957)
 Pretty for the People (Savoy, 1958) – recorded in 1957

With others
 Chet Baker, Chet Baker in New York (Riverside, 1958)
 Count Basie, Count Basie Jam Session at the Montreux Jazz Festival 1975 (Pablo, 1975)
 James Carter, Live at Baker's Keyboard Lounge (Warner Bros., 2004) – recorded in 2001
 Tadd Dameron, The Magic Touch (Riverside, 1962)
 Bennie Green, Glidin' Along (Jazzland, 1961)
 Johnny Lytle, Nice and Easy (Jazzland, 1962)
 Blue Mitchell, Big 6 (Riverside 1958)
 Jimmy Smith, Keep On Comin''' (Elektra/Musician, 1983)
 Ira Sullivan, Blue Stroll (Delmark, 1961)
 Clark Terry, Serenade to a Bus Seat (Riverside, 1957)
 Wilbur Ware, The Chicago Sound (Riverside, 1957)
 Randy Weston, Little Niles (United Artists, 1958)
 Wes Montgomery, Full House (Riverside, 1962)

 References 

Bibliography
Mike Hennessey The Little Giant: The Story of Johnny Griffin''. London: Northway Publications, 2008.

External links 

Discogs

1928 births
2008 deaths
20th-century African-American musicians
20th-century American male musicians
20th-century saxophonists
African-American saxophonists
American expatriates in France
American jazz tenor saxophonists
American male jazz musicians
American male saxophonists
Antilles Records artists
Bebop saxophonists
Black Lion Records artists
Blue Note Records artists
Galaxy Records artists
Hard bop saxophonists
Kenny Clarke/Francy Boland Big Band members
Post-bop saxophonists
Prestige Records artists
Riverside Records artists
SteepleChase Records artists
Storyville Records artists
The Jazz Messengers members